Coleophora longicornella is a moth of the family Coleophoridae. It is found from France to Italy, Greece and Hungary.

The larvae feed on Aster tripolium. The larvae make a corridor mine of up to 25 mm long. Only shortly before pupation (and long after hibernation) a case is made. The case has the form of a yellow-brown tubular silken case of 6–8 mm long with a mouth angle of about 30°. Full-grown larvae can be found as late as July.

References

longicornella
Moths described in 1893
Moths of Europe